Kermit the Hermit is a children's picture book written and illustrated by Bill Peet. It was first published in 1965. It tells the story of a greedy crab who collects and hoards all sorts of unnecessary things.  Bill Peet said he got the idea for the book from sketching crabs stacked on ice in the sea food display of a supermarket.  It has been printed in six editions and is still in print .

Plot summary
One day, when Kermit attempts to gain another unnecessary thing, he is almost buried by a dog, but is saved by a poor boy.  Kermit is grateful and wants to thank the boy, but cannot think of a way to do so until he finds a chest of gold. As he stores the gold pieces in his cave, he slowly gives up one thing at a time, until he has all the gold and no more possessions in his cave. With the help of the pelican, Kermit drops coins down the boy's chimney. The boy's family becomes rich and Kermit learns the value of sharing.

References

External links

 Houghton Mifflin profile of the book
 Interview that discusses the book

1965 children's books
American picture books
Picture books by Bill Peet
Houghton Mifflin books